"Major Moves" is a song written and recorded by American singer-songwriter and musician Hank Williams Jr.  It was released in January 1985 as the third single and title track from the album Major Moves.  The song reached #10 on the Billboard Hot Country Singles & Tracks chart.

Chart performance

References

1985 singles
1984 songs
Hank Williams Jr. songs
Songs written by Hank Williams Jr.
Song recordings produced by Jimmy Bowen
Warner Records singles
Curb Records singles